"Never Let You Down" is a song by British R&B girl group Honeyz. It was released in October 1999 as the fourth single from their debut studio album, Wonder No. 8 (1998). It was their first single to feature vocals from new member Mariama Goodman.

Track listings

UK CD1
 "Never Let You Down"
 "Summertime"
 "The Way You Make Me Feel"

UK CD2
 "Never Let You Down" (radio edit)
 "Never Let You Down" (Honky Mix)
 "Never Let You Down" (Can 7 Low Tide Mix)
 "Never Let You Down" (video)
 Mislabels the first track as the video
 
UK cassette single
 "Never Let You Down"
 "The Way You Make Me Feel"

Australian CD single
 "Never Let You Down"
 "What Does She Look Like?"
 "Keep Me Hanging On"
 "Never Let You Down" (Honky Mix)
 "Never Let You Down" (Can 7 Low Tide Mix)

Charts

References

1998 songs
1999 singles
First Avenue Records singles
Honeyz songs
Mercury Records singles